Duc d'O is a Belgian food company based in Kruibeke. It was founded in 1983 by Hendrik Verhelst, a former timber merchant. The company focused on chocolate truffles.

Duc d'O produces a range of chocolate. The company exports products to about 30 countries and offers private-label production services.

External links 
 Company website

Food and drink companies of Belgium
Companies established in 1983
Companies based in East Flanders
Kruibeke